Mohammadlu (also Romanized as Moḩammadlū) is a village in Qeshlaqat-e Afshar Rural District, Afshar District, Khodabandeh County, Zanjan Province, Iran. At the 2006 census, its population was 147, in 33 families.

References 

Populated places in Khodabandeh County